Carole Coleman (born September 1966) is an Irish journalist. Originally from Carrick-on-Shannon, County Leitrim, she is a former Washington Correspondent for Raidió Teilifís Éireann (RTÉ). Carole is a journalism graduate of the Dublin Institute of Technology (DIT) and is currently a presenter/reporter on This Week on RTÉ Radio One.

Coleman is best known in the U.S. for a probing television interview of President George W. Bush just before his official visit to Ireland in the summer of 2004. 

The interview, for which questions were approved by the White House press office, led to complaints by President Bush and his press officers for the "disrespectful" manner of Coleman, who interrupted the President several times, and the cancellation of a Laura Bush interview with RTÉ.

The White House complained to the Irish Embassy about the interview. An Irish government spokesman commented that "within Government, there was an acknowledgment that the interview lacked respect." RTÉ, however, stated it "totally stands over the conduct of the interview and Carole's journalism."

Coleman stated that she resorted to interrupting the President because she was afraid his stock answers would eat up all time she had for interview: "It was a filibuster of sorts. If I didn’t challenge him, the interview would be a wasted opportunity".
She also said she was surprised by the White House staff's reaction to the interview, but that she had no regrets:

Books
In October 2005, Coleman published Alleluia America! An Irish Journalist in Bush Country (The Liffey Press). The book begins with an account of her interview with Bush and its aftermath. It goes on to describe Coleman's travels through the parts of the United States which voted for Bush in the 2004 election and the people she met in those places. The Bush/Coleman interview has been studied using a Critical Discourse Analysis methodology.

In 2009, Coleman published The Battle for the White House ... and the Soul of America (The Liffey Press), an account of the 2008 US presidential election.

In October 2021, Coleman self-published News from Under a Coat Stand ... A Diary March-June 2020 (Orla Kelly Publishing).

References
 Carole Coleman, Alleluia America! An Irish Journalist in Bush Country (2005),  

 Carole Coleman, The Battle for The White House...and the Soul of America (2009), 
 Carole Coleman, News from Under a Coat Stand (2021),

External links
 Video of Interview-RTÉ
 Transcript of Interview-White House

Living people
20th-century Irish people
21st-century Irish people
Alumni of Dublin Institute of Technology
People from Carrick-on-Shannon
RTÉ newsreaders and journalists
Irish women radio presenters
1966 births